An Unmarried Woman is a 1978 American romantic comedy-drama film written and directed by Paul Mazursky and starring Jill Clayburgh, Alan Bates and Michael Murphy. The film was nominated for three Academy Awards: Best Picture, Best Original Screenplay, and Best Actress (Clayburgh).

Plot
Erica Benton is in a seemingly happy marriage to Martin, a successful businessman. They live together with their teenage daughter Patti in an upscale West Side apartment. Martin, however, has been having a year-long affair with a much younger woman; when he confesses to Erica that he loves his mistress and wants to marry her, Erica is devastated, and Martin moves out.

With the help of Patti, her circle of close friends, and a therapist, Erica slowly comes to terms with the divorce and begins to get her life back on track. She reluctantly tries dating again, but after Martin's betrayal and a disastrous blind date is even warier of ever finding a "good" man again. Her mistrust of men threatens her relationship with Patti, as she takes out her frustrations on Patti's boyfriend, Phil. Out of desperation, Erica sleeps with Charlie, an obnoxious, chauvinistic co-worker, but does not find the experience fulfilling.

As she grows more accustomed to her new life, she meets Saul, an abstract painter, and begins a relationship with him. Both value their independence and so have a difficult time adjusting to domestic life; when Patti meets Saul, she is initially hostile, believing Erica is trying to bring him in to replace Martin, which Saul assures Patti he does not want to do. Saul tries to convince Erica to come with him to his home in Vermont for the summer, where he spends five months every year with his children, but she refuses, not wishing to leave her daughter and her life behind for so long.

After a few tense meetings, Martin and Erica begin to act cordially towards each other, only for Martin to reveal that his girlfriend has left him and he wants Erica back. Erica rebuffs him.

Cast

 Jill Clayburgh as Erica Benton
 Alan Bates as Saul Kaplan
 Michael Murphy as Martin Benton
 Cliff Gorman as Charlie
 Pat Quinn as Sue Miller
 Kelly Bishop as Elaine Liebowitz
 Lisa Lucas as Patti Benton
 Linda Miller as Jeannette Lewin
 Andrew Duncan as Bob
 Daniel Seltzer as Dr. Jacobs
 Matthew Arkin as Phil
 Penelope Russianoff as Tanya Berkel
 Novella Nelson as Jean Starret
 Raymond J. Barry as Edward Thoreaux
 Ivan Karp as Herb Rowan
 Jill Eikenberry as Claire

The abstract expressionist paintings in the film were created by artist Paul Jenkins, who taught Alan Bates his painting technique for his acting role.

Awards and honors
It was nominated for three Academy Awards including Best Picture, Best Actress (Clayburgh) and Best Writing, Screenplay Written Directly for the Screen. Mazursky's screenplay won awards from the New York Film Critics Circle and the Los Angeles Film Critics Association.

Clayburgh won the award for Best Actress at the 1978 Cannes Film Festival.

The film was also nominated for several 1978 New York Film Critics Circle Awards, including Best Film, Best Direction, and Best Actress (Clayburgh).

The film is recognized by American Film Institute in these lists:
 2006: AFI's 100 Years...100 Cheers – Nominated

Reception
Vincent Canby in The New York Times wrote "Miss Clayburgh is nothing less than extraordinary in what is the performance of the year to date. In her we see intelligence battling feelingreason backed against the wall by pushy needs."

Pauline Kael in The New Yorker wrote: 

, An Unmarried Woman holds a rating of 90% on Rotten Tomatoes based on twenty-nine reviews. The site's consensus states: "Jill Clayburgh is wondrous as a woman who loses her marriage -- only to find herself -- in this acutely observed and lived-in portrait of New York City life."

References

External links
 
 
 An Unmarried Woman Overview
 Vincent Canby Review
An Unmarried Woman: The Business of Being a Woman an essay by Angelica Jade Bastién at the Criterion Collection

1978 films
1978 comedy-drama films
20th Century Fox films
American comedy-drama films
1970s English-language films
1970s feminist films
Films scored by Bill Conti
Films directed by Paul Mazursky
Films set in New York City
1970s American films